Michael Tieber (born 4 September 1988) is an Austrian footballer who plays for SV Lafnitz.

References

Austrian footballers
Austrian Football Bundesliga players
Kapfenberger SV players
TSV Hartberg players
SC Wiener Neustadt players
SV Lafnitz players
1989 births
Living people
Association football forwards